The Tahitian Ligue 2 is the second tier of the Fédération Tahitienne de Football in French Polynesia.

Competition format

The season begins with a regular league. At the end of the regular season the teams enter a play-off league with the bottom teams from the Ligue 1 to try and win promotion.

Teams 
These are the teams for the 2020–21 Tahiti Ligue 2 season:

Central Sport 2
Excelsior 2
Manu Ura 2
Mataiea 2
Olympique de Mahina 2
Papara
Papenoo
Pirae 2
Taiarapu
Tamarii Punaruu
Tefana 2
Temanava
Vénus 2

Recent champions

 2020–21: A.S. Tamarii Punaruu
 2019–20: AS Excelsior
 2018–19: A.S. Taravao AC
 2017–18: AS Jeunes Tahitiens (2)
 2016–17: AS Tamarii Punaruu
 2015–16: AS Tefana B
 2014–15: AS Temanava (4)
 2013–14: A.S. Tiare Tahiti (2)
 2012–13: AS Temanava (3)
 2011–12: unknown
 2010–11: AS Temanava (2)
 2009–10: AS Temanava (1)
 2008–09: A.S. Tiare Tahiti (1)
 2007–08: AS Vaiete
 2006–07: AS Aorai
 2005–06: A.S. Vénus
 2004–05: unknown
 2003–04: unknown
 2002–03: A.S. Tamarii Faa'a
 2001–02: AS Jeunes Tahitiens (1)

References

External links
Fixtures and results at Fédération Tahitienne de Football

Football competitions in French Polynesia